Wawel is a Polish confectionery company, producing many varieties of chocolates, wafers, chocolate bars and snacks. Wawel is also a well-recognized brand of candy in Poland.

History

It was founded in 1898 by Adam Piasecki in Kraków as a confectionery shop. In 1910 the production moved to a purpose-built factory, one of the largest in the city. After World War II the company was nationalised and merged with two other Kraków-based companies: Pischinger and Suchard. In 1992 the company was privatised and in 1998 entered the Warsaw Stock Exchange. In 2006 the three historic factories in Kraków were closed and production was moved to a new factory in Dobczyce. Since 2007 52.12% of its shares have been owned by the German company Hosta International.

Products

The most popular products manufactured by Wawel include Danusia (chocolate bar), Malaga, Tiki Taki, Kasztanki (chocolates), Raczki, Kukułki, Fresh & Fruity (candies) and Mieszanka Krakowska (chocolate box).

See also
Economy of Poland
E. Wedel
 List of confectionery brands

References

Companies based in Kraków
Food and drink companies established in 1898
Confectionery companies of Poland
Polish chocolate companies
Companies listed on the Warsaw Stock Exchange
Polish brands
Polish confectionery
1898 in Poland
1898 establishments in Poland
1898 establishments in Austria-Hungary